Helobata larvalis is a species of water scavenger beetle in the family Hydrophilidae. It is found in the Caribbean Sea, Central America, North America, and South America.

References

Further reading

 

Hydrophilinae
Articles created by Qbugbot
Beetles described in 1873